Eduard Semyonovich Khanok (born 1940) is a Soviet and Belarusian musician and composer. Honored Worker of Culture of the Byelorussian SSR (1982). People's Artist of Belarus (1996).

Biography
Born April 18, 1940 in Kazakhstan in a military family. In his childhood, he moved to the city of Brest, where he graduated from high school. In 1962, he graduated from the Minsk State Musical College, in 1969, the Moscow Conservatory, learning in which he wrote his first song. Member of Union of Soviet Composers since 1973.

Creation
Works in different genres — vocal-symphonic, chamber-instrumental, chamber-vocal, but most fruitfully   in  song. From his works the repertoires of ensembles Verasy, Syabry, and Pesnyary were formed. He is the author of popular songs.

Popular Songs
  White Stork  (Pesnyary)
 You Shout, Birch (Syabry)
 Robin (Verasy)
 Conversations (Maria Pakhomenko)
 It's Only the Beginning (Alla Pugacheva)
 I Live With My Grandmother (Verasy)
 You Take Me With You (Alla Pugacheva)
 Serve Russia (Alexandrov Ensemble)
 Comic Drill (Eduard Khil)
 Tick-So-Words (Balagan Limited)

Literature

References

External links
 Эдуард Ханок:  Я был самым богатым белорусским композитором
 
  Пугачёва и Галкин — два чмо. Эдуард Ханок критикует современный шоу-бизнес

1940 births
Soviet male composers
Soviet male musicians
Belarusian composers
Belarusian musicians
Living people
Moscow Conservatory alumni
Soviet songwriters
Belarusian songwriters
20th-century Russian male musicians